Moussa Koné (born 19 December 1990) is a Malian professional footballer who plays as a forward for Stade Malien.

International career

International goals
Scores and results list Mali's goal tally first.

References

1990 births
Living people
Malian footballers
Mali international footballers
AS Real Bamako players
Maghreb de Fès players
Al-Orouba SC players
Stade Malien players
Association football forwards
Malian expatriate footballers
Expatriate footballers in Morocco
Malian expatriate sportspeople in Morocco
Expatriate footballers in Oman
Malian expatriate sportspeople in Oman
21st-century Malian people
Mali A' international footballers
2020 African Nations Championship players
2022 African Nations Championship players